The Valley 8 Conference was an athletic  conference consisting of teams from the Fox Valley area of Wisconsin. The conference was formed in 1999 and lasted 8 years until 2007 when 6 teams left to form the Eastern Valley, while Hortonville and Oconto Falls joined the Bay Conference.

The teams

References

Wisconsin high school sports conferences